The Billings Bench Water Association Canal, also referred to as the Billings Canal, is an irrigation canal that starts at the Yellowstone River in Laurel, Montana, runs through Billings, Montana, under the Rims and ends at the Yellowstone River near Shepherd, Montana.

History and construction
The canal was completed in the early 1900s by the Billings Bench Water Association and the Highland Ditch company. In the 1970s, the Alkali Siphon of the canal began to leak and was replaced in 1978. In 1986, the beams that supported the tunnel for the canal underneath the Rims were replaced.

Today
The canal still plays a part in the growing Billings and the Yellowstone Valley, providing residents  and farmers with irrigation.

References

Canals in Montana
Buildings and structures in Billings, Montana